Wynberg Park, formerly known as King Edward Park, is a park situated in the southern suburb of Wynberg, Cape Town, South Africa.

It was established by the Wynberg Mayor James Bisset, who obtained the land grant for it in the early 1890s.

References

Parks in Cape Town
Wynberg, Cape Town